Kommidi Narasimha Reddy, also known as Bhudhan Reddy, is an Indian politician affiliated with the Indian National Congress. He won from Bhongir constituency, Nalgonda two times in 1978 and 1983 general elections. He gave 300 acres of land to poor people.

References 

Andhra Pradesh MLAs 1978–1983
Andhra Pradesh MLAs 1983–1985
1943 births
Living people
Indian National Congress politicians from Andhra Pradesh